Amos Amankechinelo Madu (born 21 Sept 1953) is an Anglican bishop in Nigeria: he is the current Bishop of Oji River.

He was appointed Bishop of Oji River in 1999, and was Archbishop of  Enugu from 2009 until 2014, when he was succeeded by Emmanuel Chukwuma.

Notes

Living people
Anglican bishops of Oji River
21st-century Anglican bishops in Nigeria
1953 births